The United States Office of Special Counsel is an independent U.S. government agency that protects civil service employees from unfair personnel practices.

Other offices with similar names include:
Special prosecutor, formally known as Special Counsel, charged with investigating alleged misconduct in the Executive Branch
U.S. Department of Justice Office of Special Counsel, the predecessor to the United States Office of Special Counsel
Office of Special Counsel for Immigration-Related Unfair Employment Practices, within the U.S. Department of Justice
White House Counsel (also called Counsel to the President), a staff appointee of the President of the United States